T.K Damodaran (born 1946), popularly known as T.K.D. Muzhappilangad, is an Indian author, screenplay writer, critic and orator.

Life

He was born in Muzhappilangad, a coastal village in Kerala. Besides children's literature he wrote four novels, sixteen essays on various subjects, five biographies and five plays.

He is a children's story writer in Malayalam, who has won several awards including Kerala Sahitya Akademi Award. His book Unnikkuttanum kadhakaliyum received the Kerala Sahitya Akademi Award for Children's Literature in 1983.

References

1946 births
Living people
Indian male novelists
Indian male screenwriters
Malayalam-language writers
Indian children's writers
Novelists from Kerala
20th-century Indian novelists
People from Kannur district
20th-century Indian essayists
20th-century Indian biographers
Screenwriters from Kerala
20th-century Indian male writers
Recipients of the Kerala Sahitya Akademi Award
Male biographers